Walter le Spicer was the member of Parliament for Gloucester in the 1310s, 20s, and 1330s.

References 

Year of birth missing
Year of death missing
Members of the Parliament of England (pre-1707) for Gloucester